This is the first edition of the tournament.

Irene Burillo Escorihuela won the title, defeating Grace Min in the final, 1–6, 7–6(7–4), 6–1.

Seeds

Draw

Finals

Top half

Bottom half

References

Main Draw

Georgia's Rome Tennis Open - 1